John Healey may refer to:

John Healey (politician) (born 1960) British Labour politician
John Healey (rower) (born 1927), retired British Olympic rower
John Healey (translator) (died 1610), English translator
John H. Healey (born 1952), American cancer surgeon and researcher
John P. Healey (1922–2019), American aerospace executive manager

See also
John Healy (disambiguation)